The Door to December is a novel by author Dean Koontz, released in 1985. It was originally released under the pseudonym Richard Paige.

Plot synopsis
When a pair of renowned psychologists are brutally murdered from unexpected causes, Laura McCaffrey is called to assist in the case.  Meeting with Dan Haldane, a police lieutenant, she is told that one of the victims was her divorced spouse, Dylan, who kidnapped their only daughter six years ago. While inside the crime scene, police notify Lieutenant Haldane of a naked young girl wandering the streets of Los Angeles in a daze. It turns out that the girl was Melanie McCaffrey, Laura's daughter. She was found in a catatonic, autistic state, and is sent to the hospital.  It soon becomes apparent that Dylan was using his only child in a series of experiments that combined science and the occult.  Unfortunately, it has resulted in unintended and deadly consequences.

External links
The Door to December Book Review

American thriller novels
American horror novels
1985 American novels
Novels by Dean Koontz
Works published under a pseudonym
Novels set in Los Angeles
Signet Books books